The 2017 Primeira Liga is the second edition of a football competition held in Brazil. Featuring sixteen clubs, the Santa Catarina league provides five entrants, Minas Gerais and Rio Grande do Sul leagues provide three entrants, the Rio de Janeiro and Paraná leagues provide two and the Ceará league provides one.

Qualified teams

Sources:Globo EsporteSoccerway

Format

Tiebreakers
The teams are ranked according to points (3 points for a win, 1 point for a draw, 0 points for a loss). If two or more teams are equal on points on completion of the group matches, the following criteria are applied in the order given to determine the rankings:
points won;
games won;
total goal difference;
total goals scored;
points in head-to-head matches;
lesser number of red cards received;
lesser number of yellow cards received;
draw.

Group stage

Group A

Group B

Group C

Group D

Knockout stage

Quarter-finals

Semi-finals

Final

Top goalscorers

Sources:Globo EsporteSoccerway

Media coverage

References

External links
Primeira Liga website

Primeira Liga
Primeira Liga